The following is a list of ecoregions in Nigeria, according to the Worldwide Fund for Nature (WWF).

Terrestrial ecoregions
by major habitat type

Tropical and subtropical moist broadleaf forests

 Cameroonian Highlands forests
 Cross–Niger transition forests
 Cross–Sanaga–Bioko coastal forests
 Niger Delta swamp forests
 Nigerian lowland forests

Tropical and subtropical grasslands, savannas, and shrublands

 East Sudanian savanna
 Guinean forest–savanna mosaic
 Mandara Plateau mosaic
 Northern Congolian forest-savanna mosaic
 Sahelian Acacia savanna
 West Sudanian savanna

Montane grasslands and shrublands

 Jos Plateau forest–grassland mosaic

Flooded grasslands and savannas

 Lake Chad flooded savanna

Mangroves

 Central African mangroves

Freshwater ecoregions
by bioregion

Nilo-Sudan

 Bight Coastal
 Lake Chad Catchment
 Lower Niger-Benue
 Niger Delta

West Coastal Equatorial

 Northern West Coastal Equatorial

Marine ecoregions
 Gulf of Guinea Central

References
 Burgess, Neil, Jennifer D’Amico Hales, Emma Underwood (2004). Terrestrial Ecoregions of Africa and Madagascar: A Conservation Assessment. Island Press, Washington DC.
 Spalding, Mark D., Helen E. Fox, Gerald R. Allen, Nick Davidson et al. "Marine Ecoregions of the World: A Bioregionalization of Coastal and Shelf Areas". Bioscience Vol. 57 No. 7, July/August 2007, pp. 573–583.
 Thieme, Michelle L. (2005). Freshwater Ecoregions of Africa and Madagascar: A Conservation Assessment. Island Press, Washington DC.
 Toham, Andre Kamdem et al., eds. (2006). A Vision for Biodiversity Conservation in Central Africa: Biological Priorities for Conservation in the Guinean-Congolian Forest and Freshwater Region. World Wildlife Fund, Washington DC. Page A-52.

 
Environment of Nigeria
Nigeria
Ecoregions